is a business district in Chūō-ku, Saitama, Japan. Among the buildings located in the district is the Saitama Super Arena.

The area is served by Saitama-Shintoshin Station.

Buildings and structures in Saitama (city)
New towns in Japan
New towns started in the 1980s